Avenida de Colores, Inc. was founded in 2010 by Denise Kowal as a 501(c)(3) nonprofit corporation based in Sarasota, Florida in the United States. The corporation is organized for the purpose of providing students with experiences and instruction in the visual and performing arts and to enrich communities with cultural events. The corporation produces the Sarasota Chalk Festival, a cultural event designed to that celebrate the sixteenth century performance art of Italian street painting. The corporation functions solely on donations from patrons, sponsorships, and grants and it is a fully volunteer organization.

First international street painting festival in the U.S.

While pursuing its mission to create cultural events, in 2010, the Avenida de Colores made history by producing the first international street painting festival in the United States, called the Sarasota Chalk Festival. Street painting festivals started in the United States in 1987, but this festival was the first to attract many renowned street painting artists from all over the world to participate. The festival had notable Guinness World Record holders Edgar Mueller from Germany, Leon Keer from Netherlands, and Tracy Lee Stum from the USA. Genna Panzarella from the USA, who was the first woman to receive Italy's honorable Maestra Madonnari title at the International Grazi di Curtatone competition, participated as well as Vera Bugatti from Italy, who also holds the Maestra Madonnari title. Maestro Madonnaro Edgar Mueller created a 100' x 40' 3-D street painting that is the first known contemporary street painting that metamorphosed from one image to another with the change from day to night because the painter used photoluminescent paints. The Sarasota Chalk Festival also was the first street painting festival to have a Halloween-theme for the artists work as well as three oversized 3-D installations, one of which incorporating two-point perspective.

Sarasota Chalk Festival History

As president of the Burns Square Property Owners Association, Inc., in 2007, Kowal founded a nonprofit corporation, the Avenida de Colores Chalk Festival, a street painting festival held on South Pineapple Avenue in the downtown Sarasota historic area known as Burns Square. Only twenty-two artists participated in this first festival. Lori Escalera, a leading modern Madonnari from the USA was the only professional street painter who participated.

In 2009, the second Avenida de Colores Chalk Festival was held with approximately one hundred street painters participating, who were drawn from all over the USA, and more than two hundred local stage performers.

In 2010, the Burns Square Property Owners Association relinquished the Avenida de Colores Chalk Festival to the Avenida de Colores nonprofit corporation. The street painting festival was renamed the Sarasota Chalk Festival and has grown into one of the most important street painting festivals in the world. The festival expanded several blocks in Burns Square to accommodate the two hundred and fifty street painters who participated, being drawn from all over the world, which made the Sarasota Chalk Festival the first international street painting festival in the United States. 

The festival has been relocated to Venice (also in Sarasota County) where more space is available to accommodate the large crowds attracted to the event.

References

External links
 Sarasota Chalk Festival official website

Arts organizations based in Florida
Companies based in Sarasota, Florida
Pavement art
Arts organizations established in 2010
2010 establishments in Florida